Oregon Route 74 is an Oregon, U.S. state highway running from Interstate 84 in Gilliam County to U.S. Route 395 in Umatilla County. OR 74 is known as the Heppner Highway No. 52 (see Oregon highways and routes).

Part of OR 74 is included in the Blue Mountain Scenic Byway.

Route description 

It heads southeast through Ione to Lexington. At Lexington, OR 74 overlaps OR 207 and continues southeast to Heppner. The concurrency ends at Heppner, and OR 74 continues east to Nye, ending at an intersection with US 395.

Major intersections

References

 Oregon Department of Transportation, Descriptions of US and Oregon Routes, https://web.archive.org/web/20051102084300/http://www.oregon.gov/ODOT/HWY/TRAFFIC/TEOS_Publications/PDF/Descriptions_of_US_and_Oregon_Routes.pdf, page 11.
 Oregon Department of Transportation, Heppner Highway #52, ftp://ftp.odot.state.or.us/tdb/trandata/maps/slchart_pdfs_1980_to_2002/Hwy052_2002.pdf
 Eastern Oregon Visitor's Association, Blue Mountain Scenic Byway, http://www.eova.com/byways/blue_mountain/tour4.html

074
Transportation in Umatilla County, Oregon
Transportation in Gilliam County, Oregon
Transportation in Morrow County, Oregon
Heppner, Oregon